Milane Diane Frantz (née Duncan, born 1970) is a billionaire heir to the Duncan family fortune through Enterprise Products, which remains under family control.

Early life
Milane Frantz was born in 1970 to Barbara Ann and Dan Duncan. Her father, Dan Duncan, was the co-founder of Enterprise Products.

Career
Frantz is an investor. She inherited $3.1B upon the death of her father. Due to a temporary repeal in the estate tax law for the year 2010, Duncan became the first American billionaire to pay no estate tax since its enactment. Frantz's net worth is $4.3 billion, as of April 2020.

Personal life
On July 28, 2001, she married Matthew J. Frantz, the son of Philip and Judy (Erhardt) Frantz. He died on  September 4, 2014, aged 45.
She lives in Houston, Texas.

References

1970 births
Businesspeople from Houston
American billionaires
American businesspeople in the oil industry
Female billionaires
Living people
Duncan family